Caff Records was a short lived British independent record label run by Bob Stanley of the band Saint Etienne. The label grew out of a fanzine Stanley put out with fellow band member Pete Wiggs, with the label going by the name Caff, Caff Records and Caff Corporation. Established in 1989, it is most noted for single releases by Pulp and the Manic Street Preachers. The Caff logo is a line drawing of a duck. After closing the label, Stanley together with Wiggs ran Icerink Records (1992–94), Royal Mint (1995) and EMIdisc (1996). They currently have a CD imprint called Eclipse via Universal.

Discography
Caff only released one-off singles of each group. Singles, EPs and split singles were solely released on the seven inch (7") format.

See also
 Shampoo - a pop duo who released a number of records on Icerink
 List of record labels
 Caff Discography

References

British independent record labels
Record labels established in 1989
Defunct record labels of the United Kingdom